"Die Nacht… Du bist nicht allein" (English: "The Night… You Are Not Alone") is the first single from the 2005 Schiller album Tag und Nacht with vocals by German singer Thomas D. and his wife Tina Dürr. The single was released on 14 October 2005 and peaked at number 24 on German singles chart in 2005. The single includes the song "Sonnenaufgang". The cover art work shows a graphic of the moon. The music video was shot in Berlin.

Track listing

Music video 
The music video for "Die Nacht… Du bist nicht allein" was produced by Free the Dragon Filmproduktion GmbH and was shot in one day in 2005 in Berlin by Marcus Sternberg. It has a length of 4:26 minutes. The video features Thomas D. and Christopher von Deylen. It's the first appearance of Christopher von Deylen in a music video of Schiller. The music video was shot on different locations in Berlin such as the city highway (Bundesautobahn 100) and a forest in Zehlendorf.

In the video there is used a Chaika, a luxury automobile from the Soviet Union.

Other crew members:
 Felix Storp - director of photography
 Andrés Lizana Prado - first assistant camera
 Philipp Tölke - second assistant camera
 Matthias Gelhausen - camera car driver
 Julian Holzapfel - play-back operator

Charts

References

External links
 
 The music video of Die Nacht… Du bist nicht allein
 
 The single on Discogs

2005 singles
Schiller (band) songs
Songs written by Christopher von Deylen
2005 songs
Island Records singles